Psychotria marchionica is a species of flowering plant in the family Rubiaceae. It is endemic to the Marquesas Islands.

References

marchionica
Flora of French Polynesia
Taxonomy articles created by Polbot
Taxobox binomials not recognized by IUCN